Marcel Michel (18 April 1926 – 9 May 1981) was a French racing cyclist. He rode in the 1951 Tour de France.

References

1926 births
1981 deaths
French male cyclists
Place of birth missing